This is a list of Lords Commissioners of the Treasury of Great Britain (1714–1801) and of the United Kingdom (1817–present).

In modern times, the Lords Commissioners of the Treasury are the Prime Minister (who is also the First Lord of the Treasury), the Chancellor of the Exchequer and some government whips. Although there is a small overlap, this list should not be confused with a list of ministers in HM Treasury. 

In addition, for earlier officials, see the list of Lord High Treasurers of England and Great Britain.

Commissioners of the Treasury of Great Britain (1714–1817)

Townshend ministry (1714–1717)

13 October 1714
Charles Montagu, 1st Earl of Halifax (First Lord)
Sir Richard Onslow (Chancellor of the Exchequer)
Sir William St Quintin, 3rd Baronet
Edward Wortley Montagu
Paul Methuen
23 May 1715
Charles Howard, 3rd Earl of Carlisle (First Lord)
Sir Richard Onslow (Chancellor of the Exchequer)
Sir William St Quintin, 3rd Baronet
Edward Wortley Montagu
Paul Methuen
11 October 1715
Robert Walpole (First Lord and Chancellor of the Exchequer)
Daniel Finch, Lord Finch
Sir William St Quintin, 3rd Baronet
Paul Methuen
Hon. Thomas Newport
25 June 1716
Robert Walpole (First Lord and Chancellor of the Exchequer)
Sir William St Quintin, 3rd Baronet
Paul Methuen
Thomas Newport, 1st Baron Torrington
Richard Edgcumbe

Stanhope–Sunderland ministry (1717–1718)

15 April 1717
James Stanhope (First Lord and Chancellor of the Exchequer)
Thomas Newport, 1st Baron Torrington
John Wallop
George Baillie
Thomas Micklethwaite

Stanhope–Sunderland ministry (1718–1721)

20 March 1718
Charles Spencer, 3rd Earl of Sunderland (First Lord)
John Aislabie (Chancellor of the Exchequer)
John Wallop
George Baillie
William Clayton
11 June 1720
Charles Spencer, 3rd Earl of Sunderland (First Lord)
John Aislabie
George Baillie
Sir Charles Turner
Richard Edgcumbe

Walpole–Townshend ministry (1721–1730)

3 April 1721
Robert Walpole (First Lord and Chancellor of the Exchequer)
George Baillie
Sir Charles Turner
Richard Edgcumbe
Hon. Henry Pelham
23 March 1724
Robert Walpole (First Lord and Chancellor of the Exchequer)
George Baillie
Sir Charles Turner
Hon. Henry Pelham
William Yonge
2 April 1724
Robert Walpole (First Lord and Chancellor of the Exchequer)
George Baillie
Sir Charles Turner
William Yonge
George Bubb Dodington
27 May 1725
Sir Robert Walpole (First Lord and Chancellor of the Exchequer)
Sir Charles Turner
Sir William Yonge
George Bubb Dodington
Sir William Strickland, Bt.
28 July 1727
Sir Robert Walpole (First Lord and Chancellor of the Exchequer)
Sir Charles Turner, Bt.
George Bubb Dodington
Sir George Oxenden, Bt.
William Clayton

Walpole ministry (1730–1742)

11 May 1730
Sir Robert Walpole (First Lord and Chancellor of the Exchequer)
George Bubb Dodington
Sir George Oxenden, Bt.
William Clayton, 1st Baron Sundon
Sir William Yonge
16 May 1735
Sir Robert Walpole (First Lord and Chancellor of the Exchequer)
George Bubb Dodington
Sir George Oxenden, Bt.
William Clayton, 1st Baron Sundon
George Cholmondeley, 3rd Earl of Cholmondeley
20 May 1736
Sir Robert Walpole (First Lord and Chancellor of the Exchequer)
George Bubb Dodington
Sir George Oxenden, Bt.
William Clayton, 1st Baron Sundon
Thomas Winnington
22 June 1737
Sir Robert Walpole (First Lord and Chancellor of the Exchequer)
George Bubb Dodington
William Clayton, 1st Baron Sundon
Thomas Winnington
Giles Earle
20 October 1740
Sir Robert Walpole (First Lord and Chancellor of the Exchequer)
William Clayton, 1st Baron Sundon
Thomas Winnington
Giles Earle
George Treby
28 April 1741
Sir Robert Walpole (First Lord and Chancellor of the Exchequer)
Thomas Winnington
Giles Earle
George Treby
Thomas Clutterbuck

Carteret ministry (1742–1744)

16 February 1742
Spencer Compton, 1st Earl of Wilmington (First Lord)
Samuel Sandys (Chancellor of the Exchequer)
Hon. George Compton
Sir John Rushout, 4th Baronet
Phillips Gybbon
25 August 1743
Hon. Henry Pelham (First Lord and Chancellor of the Exchequer)
Hon. George Compton
Phillips Gybbon
Charles Sackville, Earl of Middlesex
Henry Fox

Pelham ministry (1744–1746)

25 December 1744
Hon. Henry Pelham (First Lord and Chancellor of the Exchequer)
Charles Sackville, Earl of Middlesex
Henry Fox
Hon. Richard Arundell
George Lyttelton

Pelham ministry (1746–1754)
24 June 1746
Hon. Henry Pelham (First Lord and Chancellor of the Exchequer)
Charles Sackville, Earl of Middlesex
George Lyttelton
Hon. Henry Bilson Legge
John Campbell
23 June 1747
Hon. Henry Pelham (First Lord & Chancellor of the Exchequer)
George Lyttelton
Hon. Henry Bilson Legge
John Campbell
Hon. George Grenville
29 April 1749
Hon. Henry Pelham (First Lord & Chancellor of the Exchequer) (d. 18 March 1754)
George Lyttelton
John Campbell
Hon. George Grenville
Hon. Henry Vane

Newcastle ministry (1754–1756)

6 April 1754
Thomas Pelham-Holles, 1st Duke of Newcastle (First Lord)
Henry Vane, 1st Earl of Darlington
Hon. Henry Bilson Legge (Chancellor of the Exchequer)
Thomas Hay, Viscount Dupplin
Robert Nugent
22 November 1755
Thomas Pelham-Holles, 1st Duke of Newcastle (First Lord)
Henry Vane, 1st Earl of Darlington
Sir George Lyttelton, Bt. (Chancellor of the Exchequer)
Thomas Hay, Viscount Dupplin
Robert Nugent
20 December 1755
Thomas Pelham-Holles, 1st Duke of Newcastle (First Lord)
Sir George Lyttelton, Bt. (Chancellor of the Exchequer)
Robert Nugent
Percy Wyndham-O'Brien
Henry Furnese

Pitt–Devonshire ministry (1756–1757)

16 November 1756
William Cavendish, 4th Duke of Devonshire (First Lord)
Hon. Henry Bilson Legge (Chancellor of the Exchequer)
Robert Nugent
William Ponsonby, Viscount Duncannon
Hon. James Grenville

Pitt–Newcastle ministry (1757–1762)

2 July 1757
Thomas Pelham-Holles, 1st Duke of Newcastle (First Lord)
Hon. Henry Bilson Legge (Chancellor of the Exchequer)
Robert Nugent
Hon. James Grenville
Frederick North, Lord North
22 December 1759
Thomas Pelham-Holles, 1st Duke of Newcastle (First Lord)
Henry Bilson Legge (Chancellor of the Exchequer)
Hon. James Grenville
Frederick North, Lord North
James Oswald
12 March 1761
Thomas Pelham-Holles, 1st Duke of Newcastle (First Lord)
William Barrington-Shute, 2nd Viscount Barrington (Chancellor of the Exchequer)
Frederick North, Lord North
James Oswald
Gilbert Elliot

Bute ministry (1762–1763)

28 May 1762
John Stuart, 3rd Earl of Bute (First Lord)
Sir Francis Dashwood, Bt. (Chancellor of the Exchequer)
Frederick North, Lord North
James Oswald
Sir John Turner, Bt.

Grenville ministry (1763–1765)

15 April 1763
Hon. George Grenville (First Lord and Chancellor of the Exchequer)
Frederick North, Lord North
Sir John Turner, Bt.
Thomas Orby Hunter
James Harris

Rockingham ministry (1765–1766)

10 July 1765
Charles Watson-Wentworth, 2nd Marquess of Rockingham (First Lord)
William Dowdeswell (Chancellor of the Exchequer)
Lord John Cavendish
Thomas Townshend
George Onslow

Chatham ministry (1766–1768)

2 August 1766
Augustus Henry Fitzroy, 3rd Duke of Grafton (First Lord)
Hon. Charles Townshend (Chancellor of the Exchequer)
Thomas Townshend
George Onslow
Pryse Campbell
1 December 1767
Augustus Henry Fitzroy, 3rd Duke of Grafton (First Lord)
Frederick North, Lord North (Chancellor of the Exchequer)
George Onslow
Pryse Campbell
Charles Jenkinson

Grafton ministry (1768–1770)

31 December 1768
Augustus Henry Fitzroy, 3rd Duke of Grafton (First Lord)
Frederick North, Lord North (Chancellor of the Exchequer)
George Onslow
Charles Jenkinson
Jeremiah Dyson

North ministry (1770–1782)

6 February 1770
Frederick North, Lord North (First Lord and Chancellor of the Exchequer)
George Onslow
Charles Jenkinson
Jeremiah Dyson
Charles Townshend
9 January 1773
Frederick North, Lord North (First Lord and Chancellor of the Exchequer)
George Onslow
Jeremiah Dyson
Charles Townshend
Hon. Charles James Fox
12 March 1774
Frederick North, Lord North (First Lord and Chancellor of the Exchequer)
George Onslow
Charles Townshend
Francis Seymour-Conway, Viscount Beauchamp
Charles Wolfran Cornwall
5 June 1777
Frederick North, Lord North (First Lord and Chancellor of the Exchequer)
George Onslow, 4th Baron Onslow
Francis Seymour-Conway, Viscount Beauchamp
Charles Wolfran Cornwall
William Henry Lyttelton, 1st Baron Westcote
14 December 1777
Frederick North, Lord North (First Lord and Chancellor of the Exchequer)
Francis Seymour-Conway, Viscount Beauchamp
Charles Wolfran Cornwall
William Henry Lyttelton, 1st Baron Westcote
Henry Temple, 2nd Viscount Palmerston
6 September 1780
Frederick North, Lord North (First Lord and Chancellor of the Exchequer)
William Henry Lyttelton, 1st Baron Westcote
Henry Temple, 2nd Viscount Palmerston
Sir Richard Sutton, Bt.
John Buller

Rockingham ministry (1782)

27 March 1782
Charles Watson-Wentworth, 2nd Marquess of Rockingham (First Lord)
Lord John Cavendish (Chancellor of the Exchequer)
George John Spencer, Viscount Althorp
Hon. James Grenville
Frederick Montagu

Shelburne ministry (1782–1783)

13 July 1782
William Petty, 2nd Earl of Shelburne (First Lord)
Hon. William Pitt (Chancellor of the Exchequer)
Hon. James Grenville
Richard Jackson
Edward James Eliot

Fox–North coalition (1783)

4 April 1783
William Cavendish-Bentinck, 3rd Duke of Portland (First Lord)
Lord John Cavendish (Chancellor of the Exchequer)
Charles Howard, Earl of Surrey
Frederick Montagu
Sir Grey Cooper

Pitt ministry (1783–1801)

27 December 1783
Hon. William Pitt (First Lord and Chancellor of the Exchequer)
James Graham, Marquess of Graham
John Buller
Edward James Eliot
John Aubrey
19 September 1786
Hon. William Pitt (First Lord and Chancellor of the Exchequer)
James Graham, Marquess of Graham
Hon. Edward James Eliot
Sir John Aubrey, Bt.
Richard Wellesley, 2nd Earl of Mornington
8 April 1789
Hon. William Pitt (First Lord and Chancellor of the Exchequer)
Hon. Edward James Eliot
Richard Wellesley, 2nd Earl of Mornington
John Jeffreys Pratt, Viscount Bayham
Henry Bathurst, Lord Apsley
20 June 1791
Hon. William Pitt (First Lord and Chancellor of the Exchequer)
Hon. Edward James Eliot
Richard Wellesley, 2nd Earl of Mornington
John Jeffreys Pratt, Viscount Bayham
Richard Hopkins
22 June 1793
Hon. William Pitt (First Lord and Chancellor of the Exchequer)
Richard Wellesley, 2nd Earl of Mornington
John Jeffreys Pratt, Viscount Bayham
Richard Hopkins
Hon. John Thomas Townshend
7 May 1794
Hon. William Pitt (First Lord and Chancellor of the Exchequer)
Richard Wellesley, 2nd Earl of Mornington
Richard Hopkins
Hon. John Thomas Townshend
John Smyth
3 February 1797
Hon. William Pitt (First Lord and Chancellor of the Exchequer)
Richard Wellesley, 2nd Earl of Mornington
Hon. John Thomas Townshend
John Smyth
Sylvester Douglas
3 August 1797
Hon. William Pitt (First Lord and Chancellor of the Exchequer)
Hon. John Thomas Townshend
John Smyth
Sylvester Douglas
Charles Small Pybus
28 July 1800
Hon. William Pitt (First Lord and Chancellor of the Exchequer)
John Smyth
Sylvester Douglas
Charles Small Pybus
Lord Granville Leveson-Gower
9 December 1800
Hon. William Pitt (First Lord and Chancellor of the Exchequer)
John Smyth
Charles Small Pybus
Lord Granville Leveson-Gower
John Hiley Addington

Addington ministry (1801–1804)

21 March 1801
Henry Addington (First Lord and Chancellor of the Exchequer)
John Smyth
Charles Small Pybus
Lord George Thynne
Nathaniel Bond
5 July 1802
Henry Addington (First Lord and Chancellor of the Exchequer)
Charles Small Pybus
Lord George Thynne
Nathaniel Bond
John Hiley Addington
13 November 1803
Henry Addington (First Lord and Chancellor of the Exchequer)
Charles Small Pybus
Lord George Thynne
Nathaniel Bond
Hon. William Brodrick
19 November 1803
Henry Addington (First Lord and Chancellor of the Exchequer)
Lord George Thynne
Nathaniel Bond
Hon. William Brodrick
Edward Golding

Pitt ministry (1804–1806)

16 May 1804
Hon. William Pitt (First Lord and Chancellor of the Exchequer)
George Percy, Lord Lovaine
James Edward Harris, Viscount FitzHarris
Charles Long
George Spencer, Marquess of Blandford

Grenville ministry (1806–1807)

10 February 1806
William Wyndham Grenville, 1st Lord Grenville (First Lord)
Lord Henry Petty (Chancellor of the Exchequer)
John Charles Spencer, Viscount Althorp
William Wickham
John Courtenay

Portland ministry (1807–1809)

31 March 1807
William Cavendish-Bentinck, 3rd Duke of Portland (First Lord)
Hon. Spencer Perceval (Chancellor of the Exchequer)
William Henry Cavendish-Bentinck, Marquess of Titchfield
Hon. William Eliot
William Sturges Bourne
16 September 1807
William Cavendish-Bentinck, 3rd Duke of Portland (First Lord)
Hon. Spencer Perceval (Chancellor of the Exchequer)
John Foster
Hon. William Eliot
Hon. Richard Ryder
2 December 1807
William Cavendish-Bentinck, 3rd Duke of Portland (First Lord)
Hon. Spencer Perceval (Chancellor of the Exchequer)
John Foster
Hon. William Brodrick
Hon. William Eliot
Snowdon Barne

Perceval ministry (1809–1812)

6 December 1809
Hon. Spencer Perceval (First Lord and Chancellor of the Exchequer)
John Foster
Hon. William Brodrick
Hon. William Eliot
John Cuffe, 2nd Earl of Desart
Snowdon Barne
23 June 1810
Hon. Spencer Perceval (First Lord and Chancellor of the Exchequer)
John Foster
Hon. William Brodrick
Hon. William Eliot
Snowdon Barne
Hon. Berkeley Paget
6 January 1812
Hon. Spencer Perceval (First Lord and Chancellor of the Exchequer)
Hon. William Wellesley-Pole
Hon. William Brodrick
Snowdon Barne
Hon. Berkeley Paget
Richard Wellesley

Liverpool ministry (1812–1827)

16 June 1812
Robert Banks Jenkinson, 2nd Earl of Liverpool (First Lord)
Nicholas Vansittart (Chancellor of the Exchequer)
William Vesey-FitzGerald
Hon. Berkeley Paget
Frederick John Robinson
James Brogden
25 November 1813
Robert Banks Jenkinson, 2nd Earl of Liverpool (First Lord)
Nicholas Vansittart (Chancellor of the Exchequer)
William Vesey-FitzGerald
Hon. Berkeley Paget
James Brogden
William Lowther, Viscount Lowther
20 December 1813
Robert Banks Jenkinson, 2nd Earl of Liverpool (First Lord)
Nicholas Vansittart (Chancellor of the Exchequer)
William Vesey-FitzGerald
Hon. Berkeley Paget
William Lowther, Viscount Lowther
Charles Grant

Commissioners of the Treasury of the United Kingdom (since 1817)
Although the United Kingdom of Great Britain and Ireland was created in 1801, it was not until the Consolidated Fund Act 1816 when the separate offices of Lord High Treasurer of Great Britain and Lord High Treasurer of Ireland were united into one office as the Lord High Treasurer of the United Kingdom of Great Britain and Ireland on 5 January 1817. The office continued to remain vacant and the previous commissioners for exercising the office of Treasurer of the Exchequer were appointed to serve as commissioners for exercising the office of Treasurer of the Exchequer and Lord High Treasurer of Ireland.

Liverpool ministry cont. (1812–1827)

7 January 1817
Robert Banks Jenkinson, 2nd Earl of Liverpool (First Lord)
Nicholas Vansittart (Chancellor of the Exchequer)
Hon. Berkeley Paget
William Lowther, Viscount Lowther
Charles Grant
John Maxwell-Barry (formerly of the Irish Treasury)
William Odell (formerly of the Irish Treasury)
25 March 1819
Robert Banks Jenkinson, 2nd Earl of Liverpool (First Lord)
Nicholas Vansittart (Chancellor of the Exchequer)
Hon. Berkeley Paget
William Lowther, Viscount Lowther
Lord Granville Somerset
John Maxwell-Barry
Edmond Alexander Macnaghten
3 May 1823
Robert Banks Jenkinson, 2nd Earl of Liverpool (First Lord)
Frederick John Robinson (Chancellor of the Exchequer)
Hon. Berkeley Paget
William Lowther, Viscount Lowther
Lord Granville Somerset
Edmond Alexander Macnaghten
13 June 1826
Robert Banks Jenkinson, 2nd Earl of Liverpool (First Lord)
Frederick John Robinson (Chancellor of the Exchequer)
William Lowther, Viscount Lowther
Lord Granville Somerset
Francis Conyngham, Earl of Mount Charles
Edmond Alexander Macnaghten

Canning ministry (1827)

30 April 1827
George Canning (First Lord and Chancellor of the Exchequer)
Francis Conyngham, Earl of Mount Charles
Lord Francis Leveson Gower
Edward Granville, Lord Eliot
Edmund Alexander Macnaghten
31 July 1827
George Canning (First Lord and Chancellor of the Exchequer)
Francis Conyngham, Earl of Mount Charles
Lord Francis Leveson Gower
Edward Granville, Lord Eliot
Maurice FitzGerald
Edmund Alexander Macnaghten

Goderich ministry (1827–1828)

8 September 1827
Frederick John Robinson, 1st Viscount Goderich (First Lord)
John Charles Herries (Chancellor of the Exchequer)
Francis Conyngham, Earl of Mount Charles
Edward Granville, Lord Eliot
Edmund Alexander Macnaghten

Wellington–Peel ministry (1828–1830)

26 January 1828
Arthur Wellesley, 1st Duke of Wellington (First Lord)
Henry Goulburn (Chancellor of the Exchequer)
Lord Granville Somerset
Francis Conyngham, Earl of Mount Charles
Edward Granville, Lord Eliot
Edmund Alexander Macnaghten
24 April 1830
Arthur Wellesley, 1st Duke of Wellington (First Lord)
Henry Goulburn (Chancellor of the Exchequer)
Lord Granville Somerset
Edward Granville, Lord Eliot
George Bankes
Edmund Alexander Macnaghten
24 July 1830
Arthur Wellesley, 1st Duke of Wellington (First Lord)
Henry Goulburn (Chancellor of the Exchequer)
Lord Granville Somerset
Edward Granville, Lord Eliot
George Bankes
William Yates Peel

Grey ministry (1830–1834)

24 November 1830
Charles Grey, 2nd Earl Grey (First Lord)
Charles John Spencer, Viscount Althorp (Chancellor of the Exchequer)
George Nugent-Grenville, 2nd Baron Nugent
Robert Vernon Smith
Francis Thornhill Baring
Hon. George Ponsonby
22 November 1832
Charles Grey, 2nd Earl Grey (First Lord)
Charles John Spencer, Viscount Althorp (Chancellor of the Exchequer)
Robert Vernon Smith
Francis Thornhill Baring
Hon. George Ponsonby
Thomas Francis Kennedy
9 April 1834
Charles Grey, 2nd Earl Grey (First Lord)
Charles John Spencer, Viscount Althorp (Chancellor of the Exchequer)
Robert Vernon Smith
Francis Thornhill Baring
Hon. George Ponsonby
Robert Graham
20 June 1834
Charles Grey, 2nd Earl Grey (First Lord)
Charles John Spencer, Viscount Althorp (Chancellor of the Exchequer)
Robert Vernon Smith
Hon. George Ponsonby
Robert Graham
Captain Hon. George Stevens Byng

Melbourne ministry (1834)

18 July 1834
William Lamb, 2nd Viscount Melbourne (First Lord)
Charles John Spencer, Viscount Althorp (Chancellor of the Exchequer)
Robert Vernon Smith
Hon. George Ponsonby
Robert Graham
Captain Hon. George Stevens Byng

Wellington caretaker ministry (1834)

21 November 1834
Arthur Wellesley, 1st Duke of Wellington (First Lord)
James St Clair-Erskine, 2nd Earl of Rosslyn
Edward Law, 2nd Baron Ellenborough
William Wellesley, 1st Baron Maryborough
Sir John Beckett, 2nd Baronet
Joseph Planta

Peel ministry (1834–1835)

26 December 1834
Sir Robert Peel, Bt (First Lord and Chancellor of the Exchequer)
William Yates Peel
Henry Pelham-Clinton, Earl of Lincoln
William David Murray, Viscount Stormont
Charles Ross
William Ewart Gladstone
14 March 1835
Sir Robert Peel, Bt (First Lord and Chancellor of the Exchequer)
William Yates Peel
Henry Pelham-Clinton, Earl of Lincoln
William David Murray, Viscount Stormont
Charles Ross
John Iltyd Nicholl

Melbourne ministry (1835–1839)

18 April 1835
William Lamb, 2nd Viscount Melbourne (First Lord)
Thomas Spring Rice (Chancellor of the Exchequer)
Edward Adolphus Seymour, Lord Seymour
William Henry Ord
Robert Steuart
16 May 1835
William Lamb, 2nd Viscount Melbourne (First Lord)
Thomas Spring Rice (Chancellor of the Exchequer)
Edward Adolphus Seymour, Lord Seymour
William Henry Ord
Robert Steuart
Richard More O'Ferrall
18 July 1837
William Lamb, 2nd Viscount Melbourne (First Lord)
Thomas Spring Rice (Chancellor of the Exchequer)
Edward Adolphus Seymour, Lord Seymour
Robert Steuart
Richard More O'Ferrall
John Parker
28 August 1839
William Lamb, 2nd Viscount Melbourne (First Lord)
Francis Thornhill Baring (Chancellor of the Exchequer)
Robert Steuart
John Parker
Thomas Wyse, Jr.
Henry Tufnell
26 May 1840
William Lamb, 2nd Viscount Melbourne (First Lord)
Francis Thornhill Baring (Chancellor of the Exchequer)
John Parker
Thomas Wyse, Jr.
Henry Tufnell
Edward Horsman
23 June 1841
William Lamb, 2nd Viscount Melbourne (First Lord)
Francis Thornhill Baring (Chancellor of the Exchequer)
Thomas Wyse, Jr.
Henry Tufnell
Edward Horsman
William Francis Cowper

Peel ministry (1841–1846)

6 September 1841
Sir Robert Peel, Bt (First Lord)
Henry Goulburn (Chancellor of the Exchequer)
James Milnes Gaskell
Henry Bingham Baring
Alexander Pringle
John Young
21 May 1844
Sir Robert Peel, Bt (First Lord)
Henry Goulburn (Chancellor of the Exchequer)
James Milnes Gaskell
Henry Bingham Baring
Alexander Pringle
Lord Arthur Lennox
26 April 1845
Sir Robert Peel, Bt (First Lord)
Henry Goulburn (Chancellor of the Exchequer)
James Milnes Gaskell
Henry Bingham Baring
Lord Arthur Lennox
William Forbes Mackenzie
8 August 1845
Sir Robert Peel, Bt (First Lord)
Henry Goulburn (Chancellor of the Exchequer)
James Milnes Gaskell
Henry Bingham Baring
William Forbes Mackenzie
William Cripps
11 March 1846
Sir Robert Peel, Bt (First Lord)
Henry Goulburn (Chancellor of the Exchequer)
Henry Bingham Baring
William Cripps
Hon. Swynfen Thomas Carnegie
Ralph Neville

Russell ministry (1846–1852)

6 July 1846
The Lord John Russell (First Lord)
Sir Charles Wood, Bt (Chancellor of the Exchequer)
Hugh Fortescue, Viscount Ebrington
The O'Conor Don
William Gibson Craig
Henry Rich
6 August 1847
The Lord John Russell (First Lord)
Sir Charles Wood, Bt (Chancellor of the Exchequer)
Hugh Fortescue, Viscount Ebrington
William Gibson Craig
Henry Rich
Richard Montesquieu Bellew
24 December 1847
The Lord John Russell (First Lord)
Sir Charles Wood, Bt (Chancellor of the Exchequer)
William Gibson Craig
Henry Rich
Richard Montesquieu Bellew
Henry Petty-FitzMaurice, Earl of Shelburne (to August 1848)

Derby–Disraeli ministry (1852)

28 February 1852
Edward Smith-Stanley, 14th Earl of Derby (First Lord)
Benjamin Disraeli (Chancellor of the Exchequer)
Richard Grenville, Marquess of Chandos
Lord Henry Lennox
Thomas Bateson

Aberdeen ministry (1852–1855)

1 January 1853
George Hamilton-Gordon, 4th Earl of Aberdeen (First Lord)
William Ewart Gladstone (Chancellor of the Exchequer)
Lord Alfred Hervey
Francis Charteris, Lord Elcho
John Sadleir
6 March 1854
George Hamilton-Gordon, 4th Earl of Aberdeen (First Lord)
William Ewart Gladstone (Chancellor of the Exchequer)
Lord Alfred Hervey
Francis Charteris, Lord Elcho
Chichester Fortescue

Palmerston ministry (1855–1858)

10 February 1855
Henry Temple, 3rd Viscount Palmerston (First Lord)
William Ewart Gladstone (Chancellor of the Exchequer)
Lord Alfred Hervey
Francis Charteris, Baron Elcho
Chichester Fortescue
7 March 1855
Henry Temple, 3rd Viscount Palmerston (First Lord)
Sir George Cornewall Lewis, Bt (Chancellor of the Exchequer)
Charles Stanley Monck, 4th Viscount Monck
Adam Haldane-Duncan, Viscount Duncan
Chichester Fortescue
16 April 1855
Henry John Temple, 3rd Viscount Palmerston (First Lord)
Sir George Cornewall Lewis, Bt (Chancellor of the Exchequer)
Charles Stanley Monck, 4th Viscount Monck
Adam Haldane-Duncan, Viscount Duncan
Henry Brand

Derby–Disraeli ministry (1858–1859)

1 March 1858
Edward Smith-Stanley, 14th Earl of Derby (First Lord)
Benjamin Disraeli (Chancellor of the Exchequer)
Lord Henry Gordon-Lennox
Thomas Edward Taylor
Henry Whitmore
15 March 1859
Edward Smith-Stanley, 14th Earl of Derby (First Lord)
Benjamin Disraeli (Chancellor of the Exchequer)
Thomas Edward Taylor
Henry Whitmore
Peter Blackburn

Palmerston ministry (1859–1865)

24 June 1859
Henry John Temple, 3rd Viscount Palmerston (First Lord)
William Ewart Gladstone (Chancellor of the Exchequer)
Edward Knatchbull-Hugessen
Sir William Dunbar, 7th Baronet
John Bagwell
25 March 1862
Henry John Temple, 3rd Viscount Palmerston (First Lord)
William Ewart Gladstone (Chancellor of the Exchequer)
Edward Knatchbull-Hugessen
Sir William Dunbar, 7th Baronet
Lt. Col. Luke White
21 April 1865
Henry John Temple, 3rd Viscount Palmerston (First Lord)
William Ewart Gladstone (Chancellor of the Exchequer)
Edward Knatchbull-Hugessen
William Patrick Adam
Lt. Col. Luke White

Russell ministry (1865–1866)

6 November 1865
John Russell, 1st Earl Russell (First Lord)
William Ewart Gladstone (Chancellor of the Exchequer)
Edward Knatchbull-Hugessen
Lt. Col. Luke White
William Patrick Adam
2 June 1866
John Russell, 1st Earl Russell (First Lord)
William Ewart Gladstone (Chancellor of the Exchequer)
John Bonham-Carter
William Patrick Adam
John Esmonde

Derby–Disraeli ministry (1866–1868)

12 July 1866
Edward Smith-Stanley, 14th Earl of Derby (First Lord)
Benjamin Disraeli (Chancellor of the Exchequer)
Hon. Gerard James Noel
Sir Graham Graham-Montgomery, 3rd Baronet
Henry Whitmore

Disraeli ministry (1868)
29 February 1868
Benjamin Disraeli (First Lord)
George Ward Hunt (Chancellor of the Exchequer)
Hon. Gerard James Noel
Sir Graham Graham-Montgomery, 3rd Baronet
Henry Whitmore
2 November 1868
Benjamin Disraeli (First Lord)
George Ward Hunt (Chancellor of the Exchequer)
Lord Claud John Hamilton
Sir Graham Graham-Montgomery, 3rd Baronet
Henry Whitmore

Gladstone ministry (1868–1874)

16 December 1868
William Ewart Gladstone (First Lord)
Robert Lowe (Chancellor of the Exchequer)
James Stansfeld, Jr.
Henry Charles Keith Petty-Fitzmaurice, 5th Marquess of Lansdowne
William Patrick Adam
Hon. John Cranch Walker Vivian
2 November 1869
William Ewart Gladstone (First Lord)
Robert Lowe (Chancellor of the Exchequer)
Henry Charles Keith Petty-Fitzmaurice, 5th Marquess of Lansdowne
William Patrick Adam
Hon. John Cranch Walker Vivian
William Henry Gladstone
8 August 1873
William Ewart Gladstone (First Lord and Chancellor of the Exchequer)
Lord Frederick Charles Cavendish
William Henry Gladstone
Hon. Algernon William Fulke Greville

Disraeli ministry (1874–1880)

4 March 1874
Benjamin Disraeli (First Lord)
Sir Stafford Northcote, 8th Baronet (Chancellor of the Exchequer)
Arthur Philip Henry Stanhope, Viscount Mahon
Rowland Winn
Sir James Dalrymple-Horn-Elphinstone, 2nd Baronet
16 February 1876
Benjamin Disraeli, 1st Earl of Beaconsfield (First Lord)
Sir Stafford Northcote, 8th Baronet (Chancellor of the Exchequer)
John Henry Crichton, Viscount Crichton
Rowland Winn
Sir James Dalrymple-Horn-Elphinstone, 2nd Baronet

Gladstone ministry (1880–1885)

5 May 1880
William Ewart Gladstone (First Lord and Chancellor of the Exchequer)
Sir Arthur Divett Hayter, Bt.
John Holms
Charles Cecil Cotes
24 August 1881
William Ewart Gladstone (First Lord and Chancellor of the Exchequer)
Sir Arthur Divett Hayter, Bt.
John Holms
Charles Cecil Cotes
Herbert John Gladstone
26 June 1882
William Ewart Gladstone (First Lord and Chancellor of the Exchequer)
Charles Cecil Cotes
Herbert John Gladstone
Robert William Duff
1 January 1883
William Ewart Gladstone (First Lord)
Hugh Culling Eardley Childers (Chancellor of the Exchequer)
Charles Cecil Cotes
Herbert John Gladstone
Robert William Duff

Salisbury ministry (1885–1886)

29 June 1885
Stafford Henry Northcote, 1st Earl of Iddesleigh (First Lord)
Sir Michael Hicks Beach, Bt. (Chancellor of the Exchequer)
Charles Dalrymple
Hon. Sidney Herbert
Lt. Col. William Hood Walrond

Gladstone ministry (1886)

13 February 1886
William Ewart Gladstone (First Lord)
Sir William Vernon Harcourt (Chancellor of the Exchequer)
Sir Edward James Reed
Cyril Flower
George Granville Leveson-Gower

Salisbury ministry (1886–1892)

9 August 1886
Robert Arthur Talbot Gascoyne-Cecil, 3rd Marquess of Salisbury (First Lord)
Lord Randolph Henry Spencer Churchill (Chancellor of the Exchequer)
Hon. Sidney Herbert
Col. William Hood Walrond
Sir Herbert Eustace Maxwell, Bt
17 January 1887
William Henry Smith (First Lord)
George Joachim Goschen (Chancellor of the Exchequer)
Hon. Sidney Herbert
Col. William Hood Walrond
Sir Herbert Eustace Maxwell, Bt
9 November 1891
Arthur James Balfour (First Lord)
George Joachim Goschen (Chancellor of the Exchequer)
Hon. Sidney Herbert
Col. William Hood Walrond
Sir Herbert Eustace Maxwell, Bt

Gladstone ministry (1892–1894)

22 August 1892
William Ewart Gladstone (First Lord)
Sir William Vernon Harcourt (Chancellor of the Exchequer)
Thomas Edward Ellis
Richard Knight Causton
William Alexander McArthur

Rosebery ministry (1894–1895)

15 March 1894
Archibald Primrose, 5th Earl of Rosebery (First Lord)
Sir William Vernon Harcourt (Chancellor of the Exchequer)
Thomas Edward Ellis
Richard Knight Causton
William Alexander McArthur

Salisbury ministry (1895–1902)

6 July 1895
Arthur James Balfour (First Lord)
Sir Michael Hicks Beach, Bt (Chancellor of the Exchequer)
Henry Torrens Anstruther
William Hayes Fisher
Lord Stanley
November 1900
Arthur James Balfour (First Lord)
Sir Michael Hicks Beach, Bt (Chancellor of the Exchequer)
Henry Torrens Anstruther
William Hayes Fisher
Ailwyn Fellowes

Balfour ministry (1902–1905)

15 August 1902
Arthur James Balfour (First Lord)
Charles Thomson Ritchie (Chancellor of the Exchequer)
Henry Torrens Anstruther
Ailwyn Fellowes
Henry Forster
15 October 1903
Arthur James Balfour (First Lord)
Austen Chamberlain (Chancellor of the Exchequer)
Ailwyn Fellowes
Henry Forster
Lord Balcarres
17 June 1905
Arthur James Balfour (First Lord)
Austen Chamberlain (Chancellor of the Exchequer)
Henry Forster
Lord Balcarres
Lord Edmund Talbot

Campbell-Bannerman ministry (1905–1908)

22 December 1905
Sir Henry Campbell-Bannerman (First Lord)
H. H. Asquith (Chancellor of the Exchequer)
Jack Pease
Herbert Lewis
Freeman Thomas
Cecil Norton
25 January 1906
Sir Henry Campbell-Bannerman (First Lord)
H. H. Asquith (Chancellor of the Exchequer)
Jack Pease
Herbert Lewis
Cecil Norton
John Fuller
27 February 1907
Sir Henry Campbell-Bannerman (First Lord)
H. H. Asquith (Chancellor of the Exchequer)
Jack Pease
Herbert Lewis
Cecil Norton
John Henry Whitley

Asquith ministry (1908–1916)

8 April 1908
H. H. Asquith (First Lord)
David Lloyd George (Chancellor of the Exchequer)
Jack Pease
Herbert Lewis
Cecil Norton
J. H. Whitley
1 June 1908
H. H. Asquith (First Lord)
David Lloyd George (Chancellor of the Exchequer)
Herbert Lewis
Cecil Norton
J. H. Whitley
8 July 1909
H. H. Asquith (First Lord)
David Lloyd George (Chancellor of the Exchequer)
Cecil Norton
J. H. Whitley
John Gulland
Oswald Partington
7 March 1910
H. H. Asquith (First Lord)
David Lloyd George (Chancellor of the Exchequer)
John Gulland
Oswald Partington
William Benn
Ernest Soares
Percy Illingworth
26 January 1911
H. H. Asquith (First Lord)
David Lloyd George (Chancellor of the Exchequer)
Percy Illingworth
John Gulland
William Benn
Ernest Soares
William Jones
1 May 1911
H. H. Asquith (First Lord)
David Lloyd George (Chancellor of the Exchequer)
Percy Illingworth
John Gulland
William Benn
William Jones
Freddie Guest
23 February 1912
H. H. Asquith (First Lord)
David Lloyd George (Chancellor of the Exchequer)
Percy Illingworth
John Gulland
William Benn
William Jones
Sir Arthur Haworth, Bt
16 August 1912
H. H. Asquith (First Lord)
David Lloyd George (Chancellor of the Exchequer)
John Gulland
William Benn
William Jones
Henry Webb
25 January 1915
H. H. Asquith (First Lord)
David Lloyd George (Chancellor of the Exchequer)
William Benn
William Jones
Henry Webb
4 February 1915
H. H. Asquith (First Lord)
David Lloyd George (Chancellor of the Exchequer)
William Benn
William Jones
Henry Webb
Cecil Beck
Walter Rea
27 May 1915
H. H. Asquith (First Lord)
Reginald McKenna (Chancellor of the Exchequer)
George Roberts
Geoffrey Howard
William Bridgeman
Walter Rea

Lloyd George ministry (1916–1922)

11 December 1916
David Lloyd George (First Lord)
Bonar Law (Chancellor of the Exchequer)
James Hope
John Pratt
26 January 1917
David Lloyd George (First Lord)
Bonar Law (Chancellor of the Exchequer)
James Hope
John Pratt
Stanley Baldwin
29 January 1917
David Lloyd George (First Lord)
Bonar Law (Chancellor of the Exchequer)
James Hope
John Pratt
Stanley Baldwin
James Parker
Towyn Jones
21 June 1917
David Lloyd George (First Lord)
Bonar Law (Chancellor of the Exchequer)
James Hope
John Pratt
James Parker
Towyn Jones
14 January 1919
David Lloyd George (First Lord)
Austen Chamberlain (Chancellor of the Exchequer)
James Hope
John Pratt
James Parker
Towyn Jones
14 January 1919
David Lloyd George (First Lord)
Austen Chamberlain (Chancellor of the Exchequer)
John Pratt
James Parker
Towyn Jones
5 February 1919
David Lloyd George (First Lord)
Austen Chamberlain (Chancellor of the Exchequer)
John Pratt
James Parker
Towyn Jones
Robert Sanders
14 August 1919
David Lloyd George (First Lord)
Austen Chamberlain (Chancellor of the Exchequer)
Robert Sanders
James Parker
Towyn Jones
Sir Godfrey Collins
William Edge was appointed Assistant Liberal Whip at this time, but was not a Lord of the Treasury
14 February 1920
David Lloyd George (First Lord)
Austen Chamberlain (Chancellor of the Exchequer)
Sir Robert Sanders, Bt
James Parker
Towyn Jones
Sir William Sutherland
26 March 1920
David Lloyd George (First Lord)
Austen Chamberlain (Chancellor of the Exchequer)
Sir Robert Sanders, Bt
James Parker
Towyn Jones
Sir William Sutherland
1 April 1921
David Lloyd George (First Lord)
Sir Robert Horne (Chancellor of the Exchequer)
James Parker
Towyn Jones
Sir William Sutherland
Sir John Gilmour, Bt
July 1922
David Lloyd George (First Lord)
Sir Robert Horne (Chancellor of the Exchequer)
James Parker
Sir John Gilmour, Bt
Thomas Arthur Lewis

Law ministry (1922–1923)

October 1922 
Bonar Law (First Lord)
Stanley Baldwin (Chancellor of the Exchequer)
H. Douglas King
Albert Buckley
6 December 1922
Bonar Law (First Lord)
Stanley Baldwin (Chancellor of the Exchequer)
H. Douglas King
Albert Buckley
George Hennessy
6 February 1923
Bonar Law (First Lord)
Stanley Baldwin (Chancellor of the Exchequer)
H. Douglas King
Albert Buckley
George Hennessy
Frederick Thomson
22 March 1923
Bonar Law (First Lord)
Stanley Baldwin (Chancellor of the Exchequer)
H. Douglas King
George Hennessy
Frederick Thomson
William Cope
10 April 1923
Bonar Law (First Lord)
Stanley Baldwin (Chancellor of the Exchequer)
H. Douglas King
George Hennessy
William Cope
Patrick Johnston Ford

Baldwin ministry (1923–1924)

25 May 1923
Stanley Baldwin (First Lord and Chancellor of the Exchequer)
H. Douglas King
George Hennessy
William Cope
Patrick Johnston Ford
18 July 1923
Stanley Baldwin (First Lord and Chancellor of the Exchequer)
Sir William Joynson-Hicks, Bt
H. Douglas King
George Hennessy
William Cope
Patrick Johnston Ford
24 August 1923
Stanley Baldwin (First Lord)
Neville Chamberlain (Chancellor of the Exchequer)
H. Douglas King
George Hennessy
William Cope
Patrick Johnston Ford
December 1923 
Stanley Baldwin (First Lord)
Neville Chamberlain (Chancellor of the Exchequer)
H. Douglas King
George Hennessy
William Cope
Sir John Gilmour, Bt

MacDonald ministry (1924)

20 February 1924
Ramsay MacDonald (First Lord)
Philip Snowden (Chancellor of the Exchequer)
William Graham
Frederick Hall
Tom Kennedy
John Robertson
George Henry Warne

Baldwin ministry (1924–1929)

7 November 1924
Stanley Baldwin (First Lord)
Winston Churchill (Chancellor of the Exchequer)
George Hennessy
William Cope
Frederick Thomson
Viscount Curzon
Lord Stanley
17 December 1925
Stanley Baldwin (First Lord)
Winston Churchill (Chancellor of the Exchequer)
William Cope
Frederick Thomson
Viscount Curzon
Lord Stanley
28 July 1926
Stanley Baldwin (First Lord)
Winston Churchill (Chancellor of the Exchequer)
William Cope
Frederick Thomson
Viscount Curzon
Lord Stanley
David Margesson
14 January 1928
Stanley Baldwin (First Lord)
Winston Churchill (Chancellor of the Exchequer)
Viscount Curzon
David Margesson
George Bowyer
Frederick Penny
Marquess of Titchfield
15 January 1929
Stanley Baldwin (First Lord)
Winston Churchill (Chancellor of the Exchequer)
David Margesson
George Bowyer
Frederick Penny
Marquess of Titchfield
Euan Wallace

MacDonald ministry (1929–1931)

11 June 1929
Ramsay MacDonald (First Lord)
Philip Snowden (Chancellor of the Exchequer)
J. Allen Parkinson
Charles Edwards
Alfred Barnes
24 June 1929
Ramsay MacDonald (First Lord)
Philip Snowden (Chancellor of the Exchequer)
J. Allen Parkinson
Charles Edwards
Alfred Barnes
William Whiteley
Wilfred Paling
24 October 1930
Ramsay MacDonald (First Lord)
Philip Snowden (Chancellor of the Exchequer)
J. Allen Parkinson
Charles Edwards
William Whiteley
Wilfred Paling
Ernest Thurtle
20 March 1931
Ramsay MacDonald (First Lord)
Philip Snowden (Chancellor of the Exchequer)
Charles Edwards
William Whiteley
Wilfred Paling
Ernest Thurtle
Henry Charles Charleton

MacDonald ministry (1931–1935)

26 August 1931
Ramsay MacDonald (First Lord)
Philip Snowden (Chancellor of the Exchequer)
28 August 1931
Ramsay MacDonald (First Lord)
Philip Snowden (Chancellor of the Exchequer)
David Margesson
3 September 1931
Ramsay MacDonald (First Lord)
Philip Snowden (Chancellor of the Exchequer)
David Margesson
Sir Frederick Penny
Marquess of Titchfield
Euan Wallace
10 September 1931
Ramsay MacDonald (First Lord)
Philip Snowden (Chancellor of the Exchequer)
David Margesson
Sir Frederick Penny
Alec Glassey
Marquess of Titchfield
Euan Wallace
12 November 1931
Ramsay MacDonald (First Lord)
Neville Chamberlain (Chancellor of the Exchequer)
Sir Victor Warrender, Bt
Geoffrey Shakespeare
Austin Hudson
Sir Lambert Ward, Bt
Walter Womersley
1 October 1932
Ramsay MacDonald (First Lord)
Neville Chamberlain (Chancellor of the Exchequer)
Austin Hudson
Sir Lambert Ward, Bt
James Blindell
Walter Womersley
George Davies
12 April 1935
Ramsay MacDonald (First Lord)
Neville Chamberlain (Chancellor of the Exchequer)
Sir Lambert Ward, Bt
James Blindell
Sir Walter Womersley
George Davies
Archibald Southby
7 May 1935
Ramsay MacDonald (First Lord)
Neville Chamberlain (Chancellor of the Exchequer)
James Blindell
Sir Walter Womersley
Hon. James Gray Stuart
George Davies
Archibald Southby

Baldwin ministry (1935–1937)

8 June 1935
Stanley Baldwin (First Lord)
Neville Chamberlain (Chancellor of the Exchequer)
James Blindell
Sir Walter Womersley
Hon. James Gray Stuart
George Frederick Davies
Archibald Southby
7 December 1935
Stanley Baldwin (First Lord)
Neville Chamberlain (Chancellor of the Exchequer)
James Blindell
Hon. James Gray Stuart
Archibald Southby
John Morris-Jones
Hon. Arthur Hope

Chamberlain ministry (1937–1940)

29 May 1937
Neville Chamberlain (First Lord)
Sir John Simon (Chancellor of the Exchequer)
Hon. James Gray Stuart
Charles Kerr
Charles Waterhouse
Ronald Cross
Thomas Dugdale
19 October 1937
Neville Chamberlain (First Lord)
Sir John Simon (Chancellor of the Exchequer)
Hon. James Gray Stuart
Charles Kerr
Thomas Dugdale
Patrick Munro
Robert Grimston
19 May 1938
Neville Chamberlain (First Lord)
Sir John Simon (Chancellor of the Exchequer)
Hon. James Gray Stuart
Charles Kerr
Thomas Dugdale
Patrick Munro
Stephen Furness
5 April 1939
Neville Chamberlain (First Lord)
Sir John Simon (Chancellor of the Exchequer)
Hon. James Gray Stuart
Thomas Dugdale
Patrick Munro
Stephen Furness
Sir James Edmondson
13 November 1939
Neville Chamberlain (First Lord)
Sir John Simon (Chancellor of the Exchequer)
Hon. James Gray Stuart
Thomas Dugdale
Patrick Munro
Stephen Furness
Patrick Buchan-Hepburn
13 February 1940
Neville Chamberlain (First Lord)
Sir John Simon (Chancellor of the Exchequer)
Hon. James Gray Stuart
Patrick Munro
Stephen Furness
Patrick Buchan-Hepburn
William Boulton

Churchill ministry (1940–1945)

13 May 1940
Winston Churchill (First Lord)
Sir Kingsley Wood (Chancellor of the Exchequer)
Hon. James Gray Stuart
Patrick Munro
Stephen Furness
Patrick Buchan-Hepburn
William Boulton
18 May 1940
Winston Churchill (First Lord)
Sir Kingsley Wood (Chancellor of the Exchequer)
Hon. James Gray Stuart
Patrick Munro
Patrick Buchan-Hepburn
Wilfred Paling
William Boulton
26 June 1940 
Winston Churchill (First Lord)
Sir Kingsley Wood (Chancellor of the Exchequer)
Hon. James Gray Stuart
Patrick Munro
Wilfred Paling
William Boulton
James Thomas
8 February 1941
Winston Churchill (First Lord)
Sir Kingsley Wood (Chancellor of the Exchequer)
Thomas Dugdale
Patrick Munro
William Boulton
James Thomas
1 March 1941
Winston Churchill (First Lord)
Sir Kingsley Wood (Chancellor of the Exchequer)
Thomas Dugdale
Patrick Munro
William Boulton
James Thomas
William Murdoch Adamson
23 February 1942
Winston Churchill (First Lord)
Sir Kingsley Wood (Chancellor of the Exchequer)
Patrick Munro
William Boulton
James Thomas
William Murdoch Adamson
Arthur Young
13 March 1942
Winston Churchill (First Lord)
Sir Kingsley Wood (Chancellor of the Exchequer)
James Thomas
William Murdoch Adamson
Arthur Young
John McEwen
Leslie Pym
28 September 1943
Winston Churchill (First Lord)
Sir John Anderson (Chancellor of the Exchequer)
William Murdoch Adamson
Arthur Young
John McEwen
Leslie Pym
Alec Beechman
7 July 1944
Winston Churchill (First Lord)
Sir John Anderson (Chancellor of the Exchequer)
William Murdoch Adamson
John McEwen
Leslie Pym
Alec Beechman
Cedric Drewe
2 October 1944
Winston Churchill (First Lord)
Sir John Anderson (Chancellor of the Exchequer)
John McEwen
William John
Leslie Pym
Alec Beechman
Cedric Drewe
6 December 1944
Winston Churchill (First Lord)
Sir John Anderson (Chancellor of the Exchequer)
William John
Leslie Pym
Alec Beechman
Cedric Drewe
Patrick Buchan-Hepburn
28 May 1945
Winston Churchill (First Lord)
Sir John Anderson (Chancellor of the Exchequer)
Alec Beechman
Cedric Drewe
Patrick Buchan-Hepburn
Robert Cary
Charles Mott-Radclyffe

Attlee ministry (1945–1951)

4 August 1945
Clement Attlee (First Lord)
Hugh Dalton (Chancellor of the Exchequer)
Robert Taylor
Joseph Henderson
10 August 1945
Clement Attlee (First Lord)
Hugh Dalton (Chancellor of the Exchequer)
Robert Taylor
Joseph Henderson
Frank Collindridge
Arthur Blenkinsop
Michael Stewart
1 April 1946
Clement Attlee (First Lord)
Hugh Dalton (Chancellor of the Exchequer)
Robert Taylor
Joseph Henderson
Frank Collindridge
Arthur Blenkinsop
Charles Simmons
10 May 1946 
Clement Attlee (First Lord)
Hugh Dalton (Chancellor of the Exchequer)
Robert Taylor
Joseph Henderson
Frank Collindridge
Charles Simmons
William Hannan
9 December 1946
Clement Attlee (First Lord)
Hugh Dalton (Chancellor of the Exchequer)
Robert Taylor
Joseph Henderson
Charles Simmons
William Hannan
Julian Snow
17 November 1947
Clement Attlee (First Lord)
Sir Stafford Cripps (Chancellor of the Exchequer)
Robert Taylor
Joseph Henderson
Julian Snow
Charles Simmons
William Hannan
2 February 1949
Clement Attlee (First Lord)
Sir Stafford Cripps (Chancellor of the Exchequer)
Robert Taylor
Joseph Henderson
Julian Snow
William Hannan
Richard Adams
2 January 1950
Clement Attlee (First Lord)
Sir Stafford Cripps (Chancellor of the Exchequer)
Robert Taylor
Julian Snow
William Hannan
Richard Adams
William Wilkins
4 March 1950
Clement Attlee (First Lord)
Sir Stafford Cripps (Chancellor of the Exchequer)
Robert Taylor
William Hannan
Richard Adams
William Wilkins
Herbert Bowden
24 April 1950
Clement Attlee (First Lord)
Sir Stafford Cripps (Chancellor of the Exchequer)
Robert Taylor
William Hannan
William Wilkins
Herbert Bowden
Charles Royle
25 October 1950
Clement Attlee (First Lord)
Hugh Todd Naylor Gaitskell (Chancellor of the Exchequer)
Robert Taylor
William Hannan
William Wilkins
Herbert Bowden
Charles Royle

Churchill ministry (1951–1955)

27 October 1951
Winston Churchill (First Lord)
Rab Butler (Chancellor of the Exchequer)
7 November 1951
Winston Churchill (First Lord)
Rab Butler (Chancellor of the Exchequer)
Harry Mackeson
Herbert Butcher
Tam Galbraith
Dennis Vosper
Edward Heath
28 May 1951
Winston Churchill (First Lord)
Rab Butler (Chancellor of the Exchequer)
Edward Heath
Herbert Butcher
Tam Galbraith
Dennis Vosper
Hendrie Oakshott
4 July 1953
Winston Churchill (First Lord)
Rab Butler (Chancellor of the Exchequer)
Edward Heath
Tam Galbraith
Dennis Vosper
Hendrie Oakshott
Martin Redmayne, Baron Redmayne
29 July 1954
Winston Churchill (First Lord)
Rab Butler (Chancellor of the Exchequer)
Edward Heath
Dennis Vosper
Hendrie Oakshott
Martin Redmayne, Baron Redmayne
Richard Thompson

Eden ministry (1955–1957)

12 April 1955
Sir Anthony Eden (First Lord)
Rab Butler (Chancellor of the Exchequer)
Edward Heath
Hendrie Oakshott
Martin Redmayne, Baron Redmayne
Richard Thompson
Gerald Wills
14 June 1955
Sir Anthony Eden (First Lord)
Rab Butler (Chancellor of the Exchequer)
Edward Heath
Martin Redmayne, Baron Redmayne
Richard Thompson
Gerald Wills
Hon. Peter Legh
22 December 1955
Sir Anthony Eden (First Lord)
Harold Macmillan (Chancellor of the Exchequer)
Martin Redmayne, Baron Redmayne
Richard Thompson
Gerald Wills
Hon. Peter Legh
25 January 1956
Sir Anthony Eden (First Lord)
Harold Macmillan (Chancellor of the Exchequer)
Martin Redmayne, Baron Redmayne
Richard Thompson
Gerald Wills
Hon. Peter Legh
Edward Wakefield
9 April 1956
Sir Anthony Eden (First Lord)
Harold Macmillan (Chancellor of the Exchequer)
Martin Redmayne, Baron Redmayne
Gerald Wills
Hon. Peter Legh
Edward Wakefield
Harwood Harrison

Macmillan ministry (1957–1963)

14 January 1957
Harold Macmillan (First Lord)
Peter Thorneycroft (Chancellor of the Exchequer)
Martin Redmayne
Gerald Wills
Hon. Peter Legh
Edward Wakefield
Harwood Harrison
10 April 1957
Harold Macmillan (First Lord)
Peter Thorneycroft (Chancellor of the Exchequer)
Martin Redmayne
Hon. Peter Legh
Edward Wakefield
Harwood Harrison
Anthony Barber
29 October 1957
Harold Macmillan (First Lord)
Peter Thorneycroft (Chancellor of the Exchequer)
Martin Redmayne
Edward Wakefield
Harwood Harrison
Anthony Barber
Richard Brooman-White
7 January 1958
Harold Macmillan (First Lord)
Derick Heathcoat-Amory (Chancellor of the Exchequer)
Martin Redmayne
Edward Wakefield
Harwood Harrison
Anthony Barber
Richard Brooman-White
1 March 1958
Harold Macmillan (First Lord)
Derick Heathcoat-Amory (Chancellor of the Exchequer)
Martin Redmayne
Edward Wakefield
Harwood Harrison
Richard Brooman-White
Paul Bryan
30 October 1958
Harold Macmillan (First Lord)
Derick Heathcoat-Amory (Chancellor of the Exchequer)
Martin Redmayne
Harwood Harrison
Richard Brooman-White
Paul Bryan
Michael Hughes-Young
17 January 1959
Harold Macmillan (First Lord)
Derick Heathcoat-Amory (Chancellor of the Exchequer)
Martin Redmayne
Richard Brooman-White
Paul Bryan
Michael Hughes-Young
Graeme Finlay
22 October 1959
Harold Macmillan (First Lord)
Derick Heathcoat-Amory (Chancellor of the Exchequer)
Michael Hughes-Young
Richard Brooman-White
Paul Bryan
Graeme Finlay
David Gibson-Watt
22 June 1960
Harold Macmillan (First Lord)
Derick Heathcoat-Amory (Chancellor of the Exchequer)
Michael Hughes-Young
Paul Bryan
Graeme Finlay
David Gibson-Watt
Robin Chichester-Clark
28 July 1960
Harold Macmillan (First Lord)
Selwyn Lloyd (Chancellor of the Exchequer)
Michael Hughes-Young
Paul Bryan
Graeme Finlay
David Gibson-Watt
Robin Chichester-Clark
28 October 1960
Harold Macmillan (First Lord)
Selwyn Lloyd (Chancellor of the Exchequer)
Michael Hughes-Young
Paul Bryan
David Gibson-Watt
Robin Chichester-Clark
John Hill
6 March 1961
Harold Macmillan (First Lord)
Selwyn Lloyd (Chancellor of the Exchequer)
Michael Hughes-Young
David Gibson-Watt
Robin Chichester-Clark
John Hill
William Whitelaw
30 November 1961
Harold Macmillan (First Lord)
Selwyn Lloyd (Chancellor of the Exchequer)
Michael Hughes-Young
John Hill
William Whitelaw
John Peel
Michael Noble
7 March 1962
Harold Macmillan (First Lord)
Selwyn Lloyd (Chancellor of the Exchequer)
John Hill
William Whitelaw
John Peel
Michael Noble
Francis Pearson
16 July 1962
Harold Macmillan (First Lord)
Reginald Maudling (Chancellor of the Exchequer)
John Hill
William Whitelaw
John Peel
Michael Noble
Francis Pearson
7 September 1962
Harold Macmillan (First Lord)
Reginald Maudling (Chancellor of the Exchequer)
John Hill
John Peel
Francis Pearson
Gordon Campbell
Michael Hamilton
7 September 1962
Harold Macmillan (First Lord)
Reginald Maudling (Chancellor of the Exchequer)
John Hill
John Peel
Francis Pearson
Gordon Campbell
Michael Hamilton

Douglas-Home ministry (1963–1964)

21 October 1963
Sir Alec Douglas-Home (First Lord)
Reginald Maudling (Chancellor of the Exchequer)
John Hill
John Peel
Francis Pearson
Gordon Campbell
Michael Hamilton
21 November 1963
Sir Alec Douglas-Home (First Lord)
Reginald Maudling (Chancellor of the Exchequer)
John Hill
John Peel
Gordon Campbell
Michael Hamilton
Martin McLaren
12 December 1963
Sir Alec Douglas-Home (First Lord)
Reginald Maudling (Chancellor of the Exchequer)
John Hill
John Peel
Michael Hamilton
Martin McLaren
Ian MacArthur

Wilson ministry (1964–1970)

21 October 1964
Harold Wilson (First Lord)
James Callaghan (Chancellor of the Exchequer)
George Rogers
George Lawson
Jack McCann
Ifor Davies
Harriet Slater
11 January 1966 
Harold Wilson (First Lord)
James Callaghan (Chancellor of the Exchequer)
John Silkin
George Lawson
Jack McCann
Ifor Davies
Harriet Slater
14 April 1966
Harold Wilson (First Lord)
James Callaghan (Chancellor of the Exchequer)
Alan Fitch
Joseph Harper
William Howie
George Lawson
William Whitlock
6 July 1966
Harold Wilson (First Lord)
James Callaghan (Chancellor of the Exchequer)
George Lawson
Alan Fitch
Joseph Harper
William Howie
Harry Gourlay
31 March 1967
Harold Wilson (First Lord)
James Callaghan (Chancellor of the Exchequer)
William Whitlock
Alan Fitch
Joseph Harper
Harry Gourlay
Brian O'Malley
28 July 1967
Harold Wilson (First Lord)
James Callaghan (Chancellor of the Exchequer)
Brian O'Malley
Alan Fitch
Joseph Harper
Harry Gourlay
Jack McCann
28 July 1967
Harold Wilson (First Lord)
James Callaghan (Chancellor of the Exchequer)
Brian O'Malley
Alan Fitch
Joseph Harper
Harry Gourlay
Jack McCann
29 November 1967
Harold Wilson (First Lord)
Roy Jenkins (Chancellor of the Exchequer)
Brian O'Malley
Alan Fitch
Joseph Harper
Harry Gourlay
Jack McCann
29 October 1968
Harold Wilson (First Lord)
Roy Jenkins (Chancellor of the Exchequer)
Brian O'Malley
Alan Fitch
Joseph Harper
Jack McCann
Walter Harrison
13 October 1969
Harold Wilson (First Lord)
Roy Jenkins (Chancellor of the Exchequer)
Walter Harrison
Joseph Harper
Neil McBride
Ernest Armstrong
Ernest Perry

Heath ministry (1970–1974)

22 June 1970
Edward Heath (First Lord)
Iain Macleod (Chancellor of the Exchequer)
28 July 1970
Edward Heath (First Lord)
Anthony Barber (Chancellor of the Exchequer)
Reginald Eyre
Hector Monro
Bernard Weatherill
Walter Clegg
David Howell
September 1970
Edward Heath (First Lord)
Anthony Barber (Chancellor of the Exchequer)
Hector Monro
Bernard Weatherill
Walter Clegg
David Howell
21 October 1970
Edward Heath (First Lord)
Anthony Barber (Chancellor of the Exchequer)
Hector Monro
Bernard Weatherill
Walter Clegg
David Howell
Victor Goodhew
January 1971
Edward Heath (First Lord)
Anthony Barber (Chancellor of the Exchequer)
Hector Monro
Bernard Weatherill
Walter Clegg
Victor Goodhew
Paul Hawkins
July 1971
Edward Heath (First Lord)
Anthony Barber (Chancellor of the Exchequer)
Bernard Weatherill
Walter Clegg
Victor Goodhew
Paul Hawkins
October 1971
Edward Heath (First Lord)
Anthony Barber (Chancellor of the Exchequer)
Walter Clegg
Victor Goodhew
Paul Hawkins
Tim Fortescue
Keith Speed
April 1972
Edward Heath (First Lord)
Anthony Barber (Chancellor of the Exchequer)
Victor Goodhew
Paul Hawkins
Tim Fortescue
Hugh Rossi
Oscar Murton
September 1973
Edward Heath (First Lord)
Anthony Barber (Chancellor of the Exchequer)
Victor Goodhew
Paul Hawkins
Hugh Rossi
Oscar Murton
9 October 1973
Edward Heath (First Lord)
Anthony Barber (Chancellor of the Exchequer)
Paul Hawkins
Hugh Rossi
Oscar Murton
30 October 1973
Edward Heath (First Lord)
Anthony Barber (Chancellor of the Exchequer)
Paul Hawkins
Hugh Rossi
Michael Jopling
John Stradling Thomas
Hamish Gray
December 1973
Edward Heath (First Lord)
Anthony Barber (Chancellor of the Exchequer)
Hugh Rossi
Michael Jopling
John Stradling Thomas
Hamish Gray
Marcus Fox
January 1974
Edward Heath (First Lord)
Anthony Barber (Chancellor of the Exchequer)
Michael Jopling
John Stradling Thomas
Hamish Gray
Marcus Fox
Kenneth Clarke

Wilson ministry (1974–1976)

March 1974
Harold Wilson (First Lord)
Denis Healey (Chancellor of the Exchequer)
Donald Coleman
James Dunn
John Golding
James Hamilton
Thomas Pendry
June 1974
Harold Wilson (First Lord)
Denis Healey (Chancellor of the Exchequer)
Donald Coleman
James Dunn
John Golding
Thomas Pendry
Michael Cocks
October 1974
Harold Wilson (First Lord)
Denis Healey (Chancellor of the Exchequer)
Donald Coleman
James Dunn
Thomas Pendry
Michael Cocks
Jack Dormand

Callaghan ministry (1976–1979)

April 1976
James Callaghan (First Lord)
Denis Healey (Chancellor of the Exchequer)
Donald Coleman
Thomas Pendry
Jack Dormand
Edward Graham
David Stoddart
January 1977
James Callaghan (First Lord)
Denis Healey (Chancellor of the Exchequer)
Donald Coleman
Jack Dormand
Edward Graham
David Stoddart
Tom Cox
November 1977
James Callaghan (First Lord)
Denis Healey (Chancellor of the Exchequer)
Donald Coleman
Jack Dormand
Edward Graham
Tom Cox
Peter Snape
July 1978
James Callaghan (First Lord)
Denis Healey (Chancellor of the Exchequer)
Jack Dormand
Edward Graham
Tom Cox
Peter Snape
Albert Stallard
January 1979
James Callaghan (First Lord)
Denis Healey (Chancellor of the Exchequer)
Jack Dormand
Edward Graham
Tom Cox
Peter Snape
Alfred Bates

Thatcher ministry (1979–1990)

8 May 1979
Margaret Thatcher (First Lord)
Sir Geoffrey Howe (Chancellor of the Exchequer)
15 May 1979
Margaret Thatcher (First Lord)
Sir Geoffrey Howe (Chancellor of the Exchequer)
Carol Mather
Peter Morrison
Lord James Douglas-Hamilton
John MacGregor
1 June 1979
Margaret Thatcher (First Lord)
Sir Geoffrey Howe (Chancellor of the Exchequer)
Carol Mather
Peter Morrison
Lord James Douglas-Hamilton
John MacGregor
David Waddington
19 January 1981
Margaret Thatcher (First Lord)
Sir Geoffrey Howe (Chancellor of the Exchequer)
Carol Mather
Lord James Douglas-Hamilton
The Hon. Robert Boscawen
John Wakeham
John Cope
6 October 1981
Margaret Thatcher (First Lord)
Sir Geoffrey Howe (Chancellor of the Exchequer)
Robert Boscawen
John Cope
Anthony Newton
Peter Brooke
John Gummer
26 March 1982
Margaret Thatcher (First Lord)
Sir Geoffrey Howe (Chancellor of the Exchequer)
The Hon. Robert Boscawen
John Cope
Peter Brooke
John Gummer
Alastair Goodlad
24 January 1983
Margaret Thatcher (First Lord)
Sir Geoffrey Howe (Chancellor of the Exchequer)
John Cope
Peter Brooke
Alastair Goodlad
Donald Thompson
4 March 1983
Margaret Thatcher (First Lord)
Sir Geoffrey Howe (Chancellor of the Exchequer)
John Cope
Peter Brooke
Alastair Goodlad
Donald Thompson
David Hunt
22 June 1983
Margaret Thatcher (First Lord)
Nigel Lawson (Chancellor of the Exchequer)
Alastair Goodlad
Donald Thompson
David Hunt
Ian Lang
Tristan Garel-Jones
12 October 1984
Margaret Thatcher (First Lord)
Nigel Lawson (Chancellor of the Exchequer)
Donald Thompson
Ian Lang
Tristan Garel-Jones
The Hon. Archie Hamilton
John Major
17 October 1985
Margaret Thatcher (First Lord)
Nigel Lawson (Chancellor of the Exchequer)
Donald Thompson
Ian Lang
Tristan Garel-Jones
The Hon. Archie Hamilton
Tim Sainsbury
21 February 1986
Margaret Thatcher (First Lord)
Nigel Lawson (Chancellor of the Exchequer)
Donald Thompson
Tristan Garel-Jones
The Hon. Archie Hamilton
Tim Sainsbury
Michael Neubert
10 November 1986
Margaret Thatcher (First Lord)
Nigel Lawson (Chancellor of the Exchequer)
Tim Sainsbury
Michael Neubert
Tony Durant
Peter Lloyd
Mark Lennox-Boyd
17 July 1987
Margaret Thatcher (First Lord)
Nigel Lawson (Chancellor of the Exchequer)
Michael Neubert
Tony Durant
Peter Lloyd
Mark Lennox-Boyd
David Lightbown
26 August 1988
Margaret Thatcher (First Lord)
Nigel Lawson (Chancellor of the Exchequer)
Tony Durant
David Lightbown
Kenneth Carlisle
Alan Howarth
David Maclean
27 January 1989
Margaret Thatcher (First Lord)
Nigel Lawson (Chancellor of the Exchequer)
David Lightbown
Kenneth Carlisle
Alan Howarth
David Maclean
Stephen Dorrell
21 September 1989
Margaret Thatcher (First Lord)
Nigel Lawson (Chancellor of the Exchequer)
David Lightbown
Kenneth Carlisle
Stephen Dorrell
John Mark Taylor
David Heathcoat-Amory
October 1989
Margaret Thatcher (First Lord)
John Major (Chancellor of the Exchequer)
David Lightbown
Kenneth Carlisle
Stephen Dorrell
John Mark Taylor
The Hon. Tom Sackville
14 June 1990
Margaret Thatcher (First Lord)
John Major (Chancellor of the Exchequer)
David Lightbown
Kenneth Carlisle
John Mark Taylor
The Hon. Tom Sackville
Michael Fallon
12 September 1990
Margaret Thatcher (First Lord)
John Major (Chancellor of the Exchequer)
John Mark Taylor
The Hon. Tom Sackville
Sydney Chapman
Greg Knight
Irvine Patnick

Major ministry (1990–1997)

November 1990
John Major (First Lord)
Norman Lamont (Chancellor of the Exchequer)
The Hon. Tom Sackville
Sydney Chapman
Greg Knight
Irvine Patnick
Nicholas Baker
April 1992
John Major (First Lord)
Norman Lamont (Chancellor of the Exchequer)
Greg Knight
Irvine Patnick
Nicholas Baker
Timothy Wood
Tim Boswell
December 1992
John Major (First Lord)
Norman Lamont (Chancellor of the Exchequer)
Greg Knight
Irvine Patnick
Nicholas Baker
Timothy Wood
Timothy Kirkhope
1993
John Major (First Lord)
Kenneth Clarke (Chancellor of the Exchequer)
Irvine Patnick
Nicholas Baker
Timothy Wood
Timothy Kirkhope
Andrew MacKay
1994
John Major (First Lord)
Kenneth Clarke (Chancellor of the Exchequer)
Timothy Wood
Timothy Kirkhope
Andrew MacKay
Derek Conway
Andrew Mitchell
July 1995
John Major (First Lord)
Kenneth Clarke (Chancellor of the Exchequer)
Andrew MacKay
Derek Conway
Bowen Wells
Simon Burns
David Willetts
October 1995
John Major (First Lord)
Kenneth Clarke (Chancellor of the Exchequer)
Derek Conway
Bowen Wells
Simon Burns
David Willetts
Michael Bates
November 1995
John Major (First Lord)
Kenneth Clarke (Chancellor of the Exchequer)
Derek Conway
Bowen Wells
Simon Burns
Michael Bates
Liam Fox
July 1996
John Major (First Lord)
Kenneth Clarke (Chancellor of the Exchequer)
Bowen Wells
Michael Bates
Patrick McLoughlin
Roger Knapman
Richard Ottaway
December 1996
John Major (First Lord)
Kenneth Clarke (Chancellor of the Exchequer)
Bowen Wells
Patrick McLoughlin
Roger Knapman
Richard Ottaway
Gyles Brandreth

Blair ministry (1997–2007)

2 May 1997
Tony Blair (First Lord)
Gordon Brown (Chancellor of the Exchequer)
Robert Ainsworth
Graham Allen
Jim Dowd
John McFall
Jon Owen Jones
28 July 1998
Tony Blair (First Lord)
Gordon Brown (Chancellor of the Exchequer)
Robert Ainsworth
Jim Dowd
Clive Betts
David Jamieson
Jane Kennedy
11 October 1999
Tony Blair (First Lord)
Gordon Brown (Chancellor of the Exchequer)
Robert Ainsworth
Jim Dowd
Clive Betts
David Jamieson
26 January 2001
Tony Blair (First Lord)
Gordon Brown (Chancellor of the Exchequer)
Jim Dowd
Clive Betts
David Jamieson
6 February 2001
Tony Blair (First Lord)
Gordon Brown (Chancellor of the Exchequer)
Jim Dowd
Clive Betts
David Jamieson
David Clelland
12 June 2001
Tony Blair (First Lord)
Gordon Brown (Chancellor of the Exchequer)
Nick Ainger
John Heppell
Anne McGuire
Tony McNulty
Graham Stringer
29 May 2002
Tony Blair (First Lord)
Gordon Brown (Chancellor of the Exchequer)
Nick Ainger
John Heppell
Jim Fitzpatrick
Jim Murphy
Ian Pearson
Joan Ryan
Derek Twigg
Phil Woolas
14 June 2002
Tony Blair (First Lord)
Gordon Brown (Chancellor of the Exchequer)
Nick Ainger
John Heppell
Jim Fitzpatrick
Jim Murphy
Ian Pearson
Joan Ryan
Derek Twigg
14 October 2002
Tony Blair (First Lord)
Gordon Brown (Chancellor of the Exchequer)
Nick Ainger
John Heppell
Jim Fitzpatrick
Jim Murphy
Joan Ryan
Derek Twigg
Bill Rammell
28 October 2002
Tony Blair (First Lord)
Gordon Brown (Chancellor of the Exchequer)
Nick Ainger
John Heppell
Jim Fitzpatrick
Jim Murphy
Joan Ryan
Derek Twigg
13 June 2003
Tony Blair (First Lord)
Gordon Brown (Chancellor of the Exchequer)
Nick Ainger
John Heppell
Jim Murphy
Joan Ryan
Derek Twigg
December 2004
Tony Blair (First Lord)
Gordon Brown (Chancellor of the Exchequer)
Nick Ainger
John Heppell
Jim Murphy
Joan Ryan
Gillian Merron
11 May 2005
Tony Blair (First Lord)
Gordon Brown (Chancellor of the Exchequer)
Gillian Merron
Vernon Coaker
Tom Watson
David Watts
Joan Ryan
8 May 2006
Tony Blair (First Lord)
Gordon Brown (Chancellor of the Exchequer)
David Watts
Alan Campbell
Kevin Brennan
Frank Roy
Claire Ward

Brown ministry (2007–2010)

29 June 2007
Gordon Brown (First Lord)
Alistair Darling (Chancellor of the Exchequer)
David Watts
Alan Campbell
Frank Roy
Claire Ward
Steve McCabe
6 October 2008
Gordon Brown (First Lord)
Alistair Darling (Chancellor of the Exchequer)
David Watts
Frank Roy
Steve McCabe
Tony Cunningham
Bob Blizzard

Cameron–Clegg coalition (2010–2015)

May 2010
David Cameron (First Lord)
George Osborne (Chancellor of the Exchequer)
Michael Fabricant
Angela Watkinson
Jeremy Wright
Brooks Newmark
James Duddridge
September 2012
David Cameron (First Lord)
George Osborne (Chancellor of the Exchequer)
Desmond Swayne
Anne Milton
Mark Lancaster
David Evennett
Robert Goodwill
Stephen Crabb
7 October 2013
David Cameron (First Lord)
George Osborne (Chancellor of the Exchequer)
Sam Gyimah
Anne Milton
Mark Lancaster
David Evennett
Karen Bradley
Stephen Crabb
8 February 2014
David Cameron (First Lord)
George Osborne (Chancellor of the Exchequer)
Sam Gyimah
Anne Milton
Mark Lancaster
David Evennett
John Penrose
Stephen Crabb
15 July 2014
David Cameron (First Lord)
George Osborne (Chancellor of the Exchequer)
Gavin Barwell
Harriett Baldwin
Mark Lancaster
David Evennett
John Penrose
Alun Cairns

Cameron ministry (2015–2016)

13 May 2015
David Cameron (First Lord)
George Osborne (Chancellor of the Exchequer)
Mel Stride
Charlie Elphicke
George Hollingbery
David Evennett
John Penrose
Alun Cairns
19 March 2016
David Cameron (First Lord)
George Osborne (Chancellor of the Exchequer)
Mel Stride
Charlie Elphicke
George Hollingbery
David Evennett
John Penrose
Guto Bebb

May ministry (2016–2019)

17 July 2016
Theresa May (First Lord)
Philip Hammond (Chancellor of the Exchequer)
David Evennett
Guto Bebb
Steve Barclay
Guy Opperman
Robert Syms
Andrew Griffiths
15 June 2017
Theresa May (First Lord)
Philip Hammond (Chancellor of the Exchequer)
David Evennett
Guto Bebb
Mark Spencer
Heather Wheeler
David Rutley
Andrew Griffiths
9 January 2018
Theresa May (First Lord)
Philip Hammond (Chancellor of the Exchequer)
Andrew Stephenson
Paul Maynard
Craig Whittaker
Rebecca Harris
David Rutley
Nigel Adams

Johnson ministry (2019–2022) 

 3 September 2019
 Boris Johnson (First Lord)
 Sajid Javid (Chancellor of the Exchequer)
 Rebecca Harris
 David Rutley
 Michael Freer
 Michelle Donelan
 Nus Ghani
 Colin Clark
 5 February 2020
 Boris Johnson (First Lord)
 Sajid Javid (Chancellor of the Exchequer)
 Rebecca Harris
 David Rutley
 Michelle Donelan
 Iain Stewart
 Maggie Throup
 Douglas Ross
 13 March 2020
 Boris Johnson (First Lord)
 Rishi Sunak (Chancellor of the Exchequer)
 Rebecca Harris
 David Rutley
 Iain Stewart
 Maggie Throup
 James Morris
 Michael Tomlinson
 23 July 2020
 Boris Johnson (First Lord)
 Rishi Sunak (Chancellor of the Exchequer)
 Rebecca Harris
 David Rutley
 Maggie Throup
 James Morris
 Michael Tomlinson
 David Duguid
 11 March 2021
 Boris Johnson (First Lord)
 Rishi Sunak (Chancellor of the Exchequer)
 David Rutley
 Maggie Throup
 Rebecca Harris
 Michael Tomlinson
 James Morris
 Scott Mann
 4 June 2021
 Boris Johnson (First Lord)
 Rishi Sunak (Chancellor of the Exchequer)
 David Rutley
 Maggie Throup
 Rebecca Harris
 Michael Tomlinson
 James Morris
 Alan Mak
 16 November 2021
 Boris Johnson (First Lord)
 Rishi Sunak (Chancellor of the Exchequer)
 Amanda Solloway
 Lee Rowley
 Michael Tomlinson
 Alan Mak
 Craig Whittaker
 Rebecca Harris
 18 March 2022
 Boris Johnson (First Lord)
 Rishi Sunak (Chancellor of the Exchequer)
 Rebecca Harris
 Michael Tomlinson
 Alan Mak
 Lee Rowley
 Amanda Solloway
 Gareth Johnson
 25 July 2022
 Boris Johnson (First Lord)
 Nadhim Zahawi (Chancellor of the Exchequer)
 Gareth Johnson
 Scott Mann
 Craig Whittaker
 David TC Davies
 James Duddridge

Truss ministry (2022) 

 18 October 2022
 Liz Truss (First Lord)
 Kwasi Kwarteng
 David Evennett
 Amanda Solloway
 Nigel Huddleston
 Sarah Dines
 Adam Holloway

Sunak ministry (2022–) 

 28 November 2022
 Rishi Sunak (First Lord)
 Jeremy Hunt (Chancellor of the Exchequer)
 Andrew Stephenson
 Amanda Solloway
 Nigel Huddleston
 Scott Mann
 Stephen Double

References

British History Online – Treasurers and Commissioners of the Treasury 1660–1870
Whips 1970–1997
Ministerial whirl

Lists of government ministers of the United Kingdom
Lord High Treasurers
Lists of English people